Elections to Londonderry City Council were held on 20 May 1981 on the same day as the other Northern Irish local government elections. The election used five district electoral areas to elect a total of 27 councillors.

Election results

Note: "Votes" are the first preference votes.

Districts summary

|- class="unsortable" align="centre"
!rowspan=2 align="left"|Ward
! % 
!Cllrs
! % 
!Cllrs
! %
!Cllrs
! %
!Cllrs
! % 
!Cllrs
!rowspan=2|TotalCllrs
|- class="unsortable" align="center"
!colspan=2 bgcolor="" | SDLP
!colspan=2 bgcolor="" | DUP
!colspan=2 bgcolor="" | UUP
!colspan=2 bgcolor="" | IIP
!colspan=2 bgcolor="white"| Others
|-
|align="left"|Area A
|bgcolor="#99FF66"|42.4
|bgcolor="#99FF66"|3
|27.2
|2
|24.2
|1
|0.0
|0
|6.2
|0
|6
|-
|align="left"|Area B
|20.6
|1
|bgcolor="#D46A4C"|36.3
|bgcolor="#D46A4C"|2
|28.1
|2
|5.3
|0
|9.7
|0
|5
|-
|align="left"|Area C
|bgcolor="#99FF66"|53.0
|bgcolor="#99FF66"|3
|0.0
|0
|0.0
|0
|26.8
|2
|20.2
|0
|5
|-
|align="left"|Area D
|bgcolor="#99FF66"|48.2
|bgcolor="#99FF66"|3
|0.0
|0
|15.5
|1
|26.5
|1
|9.8
|0
|5
|-
|align="left"|Area E
|bgcolor="#99FF66"|49.3
|bgcolor="#99FF66"|4
|10.5
|1
|6.2
|0
|22.3
|1
|11.7
|0
|5
|- class="unsortable" class="sortbottom" style="background:#C9C9C9"
|align="left"| Total
|41.3
|14
|18.6
|5
|15.6
|4
|13.7
|4
|10.8
|0
|27
|-
|}

Districts results

Area A

1977: 3 x SDLP, 2 x UUP, 1 x DUP
1981: 3 x SDLP, 2 x DUP, 1 x UUP
1977-1981 Change: DUP gain from UUP

Area B

1977: 2 x UUP, 1 x DUP, 1 x SDLP, 1 x Alliance
1981: 2 x UUP, 2 x DUP, 1 x SDLP
1977-1981 Change: DUP gain from Alliance

Area C

1977: 3 x SDLP, 2 x Nationalist
1981: 3 x SDLP, 2 x IIP
1977-1981 Change: Nationalists (two seats) join IIP

Area D

1977: 3 x SDLP, 1 x Nationalist, 1 x UUP
1981: 3 x SDLP, 1 x IIP, 1 x DUP
1977-1981 Change: DUP gain from UUP, Nationalist joins IIP

Area E

1977: 3 x SDLP, 1 x UUP, 1 x Alliance, 1 x Nationalist
1981: 4 x SDLP, 1 x UUP, 1 x IIP
1977-1981 Change: SDLP gain from Alliance, Nationalist joins IIP

References

Derry City Council elections
Derry